The Moosacher Straße is an approximately  long street in the  district Am Riesenfeld of Munich, Germany, north of the Olympiapark.
It is the extension of the Frankfurter Ring.

Description 
The Knorr-Bremse headquarters, the BMW Group Classic museum and the Zentrale Hochschulsportanlage as well as the subway station Oberwiesenfeld are next to the street. At the Anhalter Platz (a town square) is a former World War II Bunker.

During the 1972 Olympics in Munich, the olympic press city was located at the Moosacher Straße.

The street is named after the district Moosach.

Streets in Munich
Milbertshofen-Am Hart